Raymond Jeanloz is a professor of earth and planetary science and of astronomy at the University of California, Berkeley. Educated at the California Institute of Technology, Amherst College and at Deep Springs College, he has contributed research fundamental to understanding of the composition of the Earth and the behavior of materials under high temperatures and pressures. He is working with colleagues to investigate the conditions inside supergiant exoplanets. Jeanloz is also a prominent figure in nuclear weapons policy, chairing the Committee on International Security and Arms Control at the National Academy of Sciences. He was an Annenberg Distinguished Visiting Fellow at Stanford University's Hoover Institution from 2012 to 2013. He is a co-editor of the Annual Review of Earth and Planetary Sciences.

Awards and honors
 1984 James B. Macelwane Medal, American Geophysical Union
 1988 MacArthur Foundation "genius grant."
 1992 Fellow, American Academy of Arts and Sciences
 1992 Miller Research Professor, Miller Institute, University of California Berkeley
 2004 Member, National Academy of Sciences, Geology Section.
 2008 Hans Bethe Award, Federation of American Scientists
 2009 Leo Szilard Lectureship Award of the American Physical Society for "contributions to development of sound public policy for nuclear weapons management and nuclear non-proliferation."
 2011-2016 Miller Senior Fellow, Miller Institute, University of California Berkeley

References

External links
 Jeanloz's website
 

Academic journal editors
Members of the United States National Academy of Sciences
Living people
MacArthur Fellows
University of California, Berkeley faculty
California Institute of Technology alumni
Amherst College alumni
Deep Springs College alumni
Planetary scientists
American people of Swiss-German descent
American people of Swiss-French descent
Year of birth missing (living people)
Annual Reviews (publisher) editors
Fellows of the American Physical Society